William Lumpkins (1909-2000) was an American artist and architect best known for his abstract watercolors and pioneering solar adobe architecture. He was a founding member of the Transcendental Painting Group and cofounder of the Santa Fe Art Institute with Pony Ault.

Early life and education
William Thomas Lumpkins was born on April 8, 1909 at Rabbit Ears Ranch in Territorial New Mexico, one of five children born to Julia and William Lumpkins. In 1929 he graduated from Roswell High School, where he had met and befriended artist Peter Hurd. He studied art at the University of New Mexico and architecture at University of Southern California.

Architecture career
Bill Lumpkins was an early proponent of passive solar design, having built his first passive solar house in Capitan, NM in 1935. The former residence of solar scientist Dr. J. Douglas Balcomb in Santa Fe, designed by Lumpkins with his company Sun Mountain Design, is considered by many the "quintessential solar adobe house." Lumpkins' adobe building designs were featured in the 1982 exhibition "Des Architecture de Terre" held at the Centre Georges Pompidou and were the subject of a book, Pueblo Architecture and Modern Adobes : The Residential Designs of William Lumpkins.

Lumpkins' architectural work also included many restoration projects in New Mexico, including Santa Fe's Santuario de Guadalupe and hotel La Fonda.

Other buildings Lumpkins designed include:
William Black House
Athenaeum Music & Arts Library
The Fort

Painting career
Lumpkins started exhibiting his paintings in 1932, most of which were watercolors. He met artist Raymond Jonson in Santa Fe in 1935, and exhibited with Jonson and other members of the Transcendental Painting Group from 1938-1942.  Lumpkins was one of the earlier Abstract Expressionists, having employed the style about a decade before other American artists popularized it .  His work has been exhibited at commercial art galleries, California Palace of the Legion of Honor, 1939 New York World's Fair, and New Mexico Museum of Art

Public collections
 Museum of Fine Arts Boston
 New Mexico Museum of Art
 Museum of Contemporary Art San Diego
 Roswell Museum and Art Center
 The Albuquerque Museum

Writings
Lumpkins wrote three books about Southwestern architecture : 
 
  and

Legacy
In 1985 Lumpkins was awarded the New Mexico Governor's Award for Excellence in the Arts for both art and architecture. The Lumpkins Ballroom at the La Fonda hotel in Santa Fe was named after him.

References

Artists from New Mexico
USC School of Architecture alumni
20th-century American architects
20th-century American painters
American male painters
1909 births
2000 deaths
University of New Mexico alumni
Federal Art Project artists
20th-century American male artists